Katherine Fonshell (born October 10, 1969) is an American long-distance runner. She competed in the women's 10,000 metres at the 1996 Summer Olympics.

References

External links
 

1969 births
Living people
Athletes (track and field) at the 1996 Summer Olympics
American female long-distance runners
Olympic track and field athletes of the United States
Place of birth missing (living people)
21st-century American women